The Battle of Blue Waters was a battle fought at some time in autumn 1362 or 1363 on the banks of the Syniukha river, left tributary of the Southern Bug, between the armies of the Grand Duchy of Lithuania and the Golden Horde. The Lithuanians won a decisive victory and finalized their conquest of the Principality of Kiev.

Background

After the death of its ruler Berdi Beg Khan in 1359 the Golden Horde experienced a series of succession disputes and wars that lasted two decades (1359–81). The Horde began fracturing into separate districts (ulus). Taking advantage of internal disorder within the Horde, Grand Duke Algirdas of Lithuania organized a campaign into Tatar lands. He aimed to secure and expand southern territories of the Grand Duchy of Lithuania, particularly the Principality of Kiev. Kiev had already come under semi-Lithuanian control after the Battle on the Irpin River in early 1320s, but still paid tribute to the Horde.

Battle
In 1362 or 1363, Algirdas marched between lower Dnieper and Southern Bug. First, Algirdas captured remaining territories of the Principality of Chernigov – the bulk of the territory, including the capital in Bryansk, fell under Lithuanian control around 1357–1358. The Lithuanians then attacked Korshev (Коршов), an unidentified fortress located in the upper reaches of the Bystraya Sosna River, tributary of the Don River. It is believed that Algirdas further conquered territories of the former Principality of Pereyaslavl. The area belonged to Crimean ulus which was engaged in a campaign against New Sarai and could not organize effective resistance. In autumn, the Lithuanian army moved west and crossed the Dnieper River towards Podolia. Three Tatar beys of Podolia gathered an army to resist the invasion. It is believed that the armies met at present-day Torhovytsia. At the time the town was known as Yabgu in Turkic, or viceroy, regent town, and Sinie Vody in Russian, or Blue Waters.

A short description of the battle survives only from late and not very reliable work of Maciej Stryjkowski, published in 1582. According to Stryjkowski, Algirdas organized his army into six groups and arranged them in a half circle. The Tatars started the battle by hurling arrows into the sides of the Lithuanian formation. Such attacks had little effect and the Lithuanians and Ruthenians, armed with spears and swords, moved forward and broke the front lines of the Tatar army. Sons of Karijotas with units from Naugardukas attacked Tatar flanks with crossbows. The Tatars could not maintain their formation and broke into a disorganized retreat. Algirdas achieved a decisive victory.

Aftermath
The victory brought Kiev and a large part of present-day Ukraine, including sparsely populated Podolia and Dykra, under the control of the expanding Grand Duchy of Lithuania. Lithuania also gained access to the Black Sea. Algirdas left his son Vladimir in Kiev. After taking Kiev, Lithuania became a direct neighbor and rival of the Grand Duchy of Moscow. Podolia was entrusted to Aleksander, Yuri, Konstantin, and Fyodor – Karijotas' sons, Algirdas' nephews, and commanders during the battle.

Historiography

The battle has received comparatively little attention from historians. Some of it is attributed to lack of historical sources. It received a handful of fragmentary mentions in Ruthenian and Rus' chronicles. The most important source of information is the Tale about Podolia, which was incorporated into the Lithuanian Chronicles. The Tale was produced by the Lithuanians sometime around the Lithuanian Civil War (1432–38) when Lithuania fought against Poland for control of Podolia. As such, the Tale is a piece of political propaganda written to support Lithuanian claims to Podolia and exalt virtues of Karijotas's sons rather than to give an accurate account of military campaign. Slavic historians tended to minimize importance of the battle. Lithuanian historian Tomas Baranauskas claims that Russian historians chose to emphasize their victory against the Tatars in the 1380 Battle of Kulikovo while Polish historians did not want to emphasize Lithuanian claims to Podolia. For example, Jan Długosz did not mention the battle at all.

However, in the 20th century interest in the battle increased. Polish historian Stefan Maria Kuczyński produced a dedicated study Sine Wody in 1935, Lithuanian Romas Batūra published Lietuva tautų kovoje prieš Aukso ordą. Nuo Batu antplūdžio iki mūšio prie Mėlynųjų Vandenų in 1975, and Ukrainian Felix Shabuldo published numerous articles. Ukrainian historians held two conferences in Kropyvnytskyi in 1997 and 1998. The resulting collection of articles was published by the Institute of History of Ukraine in 2005. In 2012, another conference, dedicated to the 650th anniversary of the battle, was held by the Vytautas Magnus University.

In 2022, the National bank of Belarus issued a commemorative coin dedicated to the Battle of Blue Waters with a portrait of duke Olgierd.

References

Further reading
 

Blue Waters
Blue Waters
Medieval Ukraine
Military history of Kyiv
Blue Waters
1362 in Europe
14th century in Lithuania
Blue Waters
History of Kirovohrad Oblast
1360s in the Mongol Empire